Charles of Orléans (24 November 1394 – 5 January 1465) was Duke of Orléans from 1407, following the murder of his father, Louis I, Duke of Orléans. He was also Duke of Valois, Count of Beaumont-sur-Oise and of Blois, Lord of Coucy, and the inheritor of Asti in Italy via his mother Valentina Visconti.

He is now remembered as an accomplished medieval poet, owing to the more than five hundred extant poems he produced, written in both French and English, during his 25 years spent as a prisoner of war and after his return to France.

Accession 
Charles was born in Paris, the son of Louis I, Duke of Orléans and Valentina Visconti, daughter of Gian Galeazzo Visconti, Duke of Milan.  He acceded to the duchy at the age of thirteen after his father had been assassinated on the orders of John the Fearless, Duke of Burgundy. Charles was expected to carry on his father's leadership against the Burgundians, a French faction which supported the Duke of Burgundy. The latter was never punished for his role in Louis' assassination, and Charles had to watch as his grief-stricken mother Valentina Visconti succumbed to illness not long afterwards. At her deathbed, Charles and the other boys of the family were made to swear the traditional oath of vengeance for their father's murder.

During the early years of his reign as duke, the orphaned Charles was heavily influenced by the guidance of his father-in-law, Bernard VII, Count of Armagnac, for which reason Charles' faction came to be known as the Armagnacs.

Even before his father's death, he received a  pension of 12,000 livres from King Charles VI, his uncle, in 1403. In addition, his first marriage, to Isabella of Valois, widow of Richard II of England, may have brought him a dowry of 500,000 francs.

Imprisonment 
After the war with the Kingdom of England was renewed in 1415, Charles was one of the many French noblemen at the Battle of Agincourt on 25 October 1415. He was discovered unwounded but trapped under a pile of corpses. He was taken prisoner by the English, and spent the next twenty-four years as their hostage. After his capture, his entire library was moved by Yolande of Aragon to Saumur, to prevent it from falling into enemy hands.

He was held at various locations, and moved from one castle to another in England, including the Tower of London, Bolingbroke Castle 1422-1423 (where he contributed to the building of the Church tower) and Pontefract Castle – the castle where England's young King Richard II (first husband of Charles's own deceased first wife Isabella of Valois) had been imprisoned and died 15 years earlier at the age of 33. His last place of confinement seems to have been Stourton, Wiltshire.

The conditions of his confinement were not strict; he was allowed to live more or less in the manner to which he had become accustomed, like so many other captured nobles. However, he was not offered release in exchange for a ransom, since the English King Henry V had left instructions forbidding any release: Charles was the natural head of the Armagnac faction and in the line of succession to the French throne, and was therefore deemed too important to be returned to circulation.

Poetry 
It was during these twenty-four years that Charles would write most of his poetry, including melancholy works which seem to be commenting on the captivity itself, such as En la forêt de longue attente.

The majority of his output consists of two books, one in French and the other in English, in the ballade and rondeau fixed forms. Though once controversial, it is now abundantly clear that Charles wrote the English poems which he left behind when he was released in 1440. Unfortunately, his acceptance in the English canon has been slow. A. E. B. Coldiron has argued that the problem relates to his "approach to the erotic, his use of puns, wordplay, and rhetorical devices, his formal complexity and experimentation, his stance or voice: all these place him well outside the fifteenth-century literary milieu in which he found himself in England.

One of his poems, Is she not passing fair?, was translated by Louisa Stuart Costello and set to music by Edward Elgar. Claude Debussy set three of his poems to music in his Trois Chansons de Charles d'Orléans, L.92, for unaccompanied mixed choir. Reynaldo Hahn set six of them : Les Fourriers d'été, Comment se peut-il faire ainsi, Un loyal cœur (Chansons et Madrigaux - 1907) ; Quand je fus pris au pavillon, Je me mets en votre mercy, Gardez le trait de la fenêtre (Rondels - 1899).

Freedom 
Finally freed on 3 November 1440 by the efforts of his former enemies, Philip the Good and Isabella of Portugal, the Duke and Duchess of Burgundy, he set foot on French soil again after 25 years, by now a middle-aged man at 46 and "speaking better English than French," according to the English chronicler Raphael Holinshed. Part of the agreement, concluded the previous July, was an immediate ransom payment of 80,000 , and a promise to pay 140,000 crowns later. Philip the Good had also made it a condition that the murder of Charles' father Louis of Orleans by Philip's own father, John the Fearless, would not be avenged (John himself had been assassinated in 1419).

Charles agreed to this condition prior to his release. Meeting the Duchess of Burgundy after disembarking, the gallant Charles said: "M'Lady, I make myself your prisoner." At the celebration of his third marriage, to Marie of Cleves (Philip's niece), he was created a Knight of the Golden Fleece. His subsequent return to Orléans was marked by a splendid celebration organised by the citizens. Marie brought a considerable dowry, which helped to pay part of his ransom, although he had difficulty making up the balance, and that of his brother Jean d'Angoulême, also a prisoner.

He made an unsuccessful attempt to press his claims to Asti in Italy, before settling down as a celebrated patron of the arts. In Blois, he kept a miniature court at which many of the French men of letters at the time—François Villon, Olivier de la Marche, Georges Chastellain, Jean Meschinot and others—were residents or visitors or correspondents. He died at Amboise in his 71st year.

Marriage and children

Charles married three times. His first marriage, in 1406 at Compiègne, was with his first cousin Isabella of Valois, daughter of Charles VI of France and widow of Richard II of England. She died three years later in childbirth aged 19. Their daughter Joan survived and married John II of Alençon in 1424 in Blois, but died childless.

Secondly, Charles married Bonne of Armagnac, the daughter of Bernard VII, Count of Armagnac, in 1410. Bonne died before he returned from captivity. The couple had no mutual children.

On his return to France in 1440, Charles married Marie of Cleves in Saint-Omer (daughter of Adolph I, Duke of Cleves) and niece of Philip the Good, who had arranged his release. They had three children:
Marie of Orléans (19 December 1457 – 1493, Mazères). Married Jean of Foix in 1483.
Louis XII of France (1462–1515).
 Anne of Orléans (1464–1491, Poitiers), Abbess of Fontevrault and Holy Cross Abbey Poitiers.

Honours
  – Duchy of Orléans : Grand Master and Knight of the Order of the Porcupine
  : Knight of the Order of the Golden Fleece ( List )

In fiction and popular culture
 Charles appears as "Duke of Orléans" in William Shakespeare's Henry V. In the 2012 television adaptation The Hollow Crown, Charles is played by French actor Stanley Weber and is inaccurately portrayed as dying at Agincourt.
 The critically acclaimed historical novel Het Woud der Verwachting / Le Forêt de Longue Attente (1949) by Hella Haasse (translated into English in 1989 under the title In a Dark Wood Wandering) gives a sympathetic description of the life of Charles, Duke of Orléans.
 Charles is a major character in Margaret Frazer's The Maiden's Tale, a historical mystery and fictional account of a few weeks of his life in England in the autumn of 1439, shortly before his release in 1440.
 Charles is a minor character in the historical fiction novel Crown in Candlelight by Rosemary Hawley Jarman.
 Charles is referenced as the author of "the first known Valentine" in Netflix original Big Mouth's Valentine's Day special, "My Furry Valentine".
 Charles’ words "The world is weary of me. And I am weary of it." appear as an epigraph in Michel Houellebecq’s The Map and the Territory.

References

Sources

  This includes Saintsbury's own assessment of the poems.

External links

 BnF MS. fr. 25458, the personal manuscript of Charles d'Orléans at Gallica
 Collection of English poems by Charles d'Orléans, composed during his captivity in England, at the British Library.
 
 
 
 The Online Medieval Sources Bibliography cites print and online works by Charles d'Orléans

1394 births
1465 deaths
15th-century peers of France
Armagnac faction
Counts of Blois
Counts of Soissons
Dukes of Orléans
Dukes of Valois
French male poets
15th-century French poets
French prisoners of war in the Hundred Years' War
Heirs presumptive to the French throne
House of Valois-Orléans
Knights of the Golden Fleece
Knights of the Order of the Porcupine
People of the Hundred Years' War
Prisoners in the Tower of London
Writers from Paris
Royal reburials